The  is a term used in Japan for three figures that played an important role in the Meiji Restoration in 1868 and are regarded as the founders of the modern state of Japan.

The Three Great Nobles were:
 Ōkubo Toshimichi of the Satsuma Domain (Satsuma-han)
 Saigō Takamori of the Satsuma Domain (Satsuma-han)
 Kido Takayoshi (also known as Katsura Kogorō) of the Chōshū Domain (Chōshū-han)

All Three Great Nobles were samurai of the Satchō Alliance, and died within a short period of time between 1877 (Meiji 10) and 1878 (Meiji 11). Saigō led the Satsuma Rebellion, the largest uprising against the new Meiji government, and died at the Battle of Shiroyama. Kido died from an unknown illness during the Satsuma Rebellion, and Ōkubo was later assassinated by former samurai of the Satsuma Domain for his involvement against the uprising.

References

Nobles of the Meiji Restoration